Slobodan Mitić (born August 12, 1968) is a Serbian former professional basketball player.

He played for Zdravlje, MZT, Nemetali Ogražden and Vardar.

References

External links
 Player Profile at eurobasket.com

1968 births
Living people
Basketball League of Serbia players
KK MZT Skopje players
KK Zdravlje players
Serbian expatriate basketball people in North Macedonia
Serbian men's basketball players
Sportspeople from Leskovac
Centers (basketball)